The 1950 International cricket season was from April 1950 to August 1950.

Season overview

June

West Indies in England

August

England in Netherlands

References

1950 in cricket